Dundas Strait is a sea passage in the Northern Territory of Australia located between Melville Island and the Cobourg Peninsula. It connects the Timor Sea to the Van Diemen Gulf.

References

Bodies of water of the Northern Territory
Straits of Australia